National Highway 927A, commonly referred to as NH 927A is a national highway in India. It is a spur road of National Highway 27. NH-927A traverses the states of Rajasthan and Madhya Pradesh in India.

Route 
Swaroopganj, Kotra, Kherwara, Dungarpur, Sagwara, Partapur, Banswara, Ratlam.

Junctions  

  Terminal near Sawarupganj.
  near Kotra.
  near Kherwara
  near Banswara.
  Terminal near Ratlam.

See also 

 List of National Highways in India by highway number
 List of National Highways in India by state

References

External links 

 NH 927A on OpenStreetMap

National highways in India
National Highways in Rajasthan
National Highways in Madhya Pradesh